Inskaya Street is a street in Oktyabrsky City District of Novosibirsk, Russia. It consists of two fragments. The first fragment starts from Ippodromskaya Street and runs southeast, then the street is interrupted by Kommunalny Bridge. The second street fragment starts from the T-intersection with Bogatkov Street, crosses Guryevskaya Street and forms the T-shaped intersection with Dobrolyubov Street.

History
In tsarist times, Inskaya Street was lined with illegal brothels.

In the mid-1950s, the street was divided by Kommunalny Bridge.

Architecture
 House of District Committee is a building built in 1908.
 House of Terentyevs is a building built in 1909.

In literature
The street is mentioned in "Horse Thief and High School Girl" by Novosibirsk writer Mikhail Shchukin.

References

Oktyabrsky District, Novosibirsk
Streets in Novosibirsk